Gumbo'! is a studio album by American artist Pink Siifu. It was released on August 3, 2021, and contains collaborations with the Alchemist and the Avalanches. The album's first single, "Lng Hair Dnt Care", was produced by Ted Kamal.

Critical reception

Gumbo'! received generally favorable reviews. At Metacritic, which assigns a normalized rating out of 100 to reviews from mainstream critics, the album received an average score of 83, based on 5 professional critic reviews, which indicates "universal acclaim". Jonathan St. Michael from Exclaim! rated this album 7/10, saying it's "tapping into elements of trap and exploring layers of Southern-styled neo-soul".

Track listing 
Track listing and credits adapted from Spotify.

References

External links
 

2021 albums
Pink Siifu albums
Hip hop albums by American artists
Neo soul albums
Albums produced by the Alchemist (musician)